John Burnside FRSL FRSE (born 19 March 1955) is a Scottish writer. He is one of only three poets (the others being Ted Hughes and Sean O'Brien) to have won both the T. S. Eliot Prize and the Forward Poetry Prize for the same book (Black Cat Bone).

Life and works
Burnside was born in Dunfermline and raised in Cowdenbeath and Corby. He studied English and European Thought and Literature at Cambridge College of Arts and Technology. A former computer software engineer, he has been a freelance writer since 1996. He is a former Writer in Residence at the University of Dundee and is now Professor in Creative Writing at St Andrews University, where he teaches creative writing, literature and ecology and American poetry. His first collection of poetry, The Hoop, was published in 1988 and won a Scottish Arts Council Book Award. Other poetry collections include Common Knowledge (1991), Feast Days (1992), winner of the Geoffrey Faber Memorial Prize, and The Asylum Dance (2000), winner of the Whitbread Poetry Award and shortlisted for both the Forward Poetry Prize (Best Poetry Collection of the Year) and the T. S. Eliot Prize. The Light Trap (2001) was also shortlisted for the T. S. Eliot Prize. His 2011 collection, Black Cat Bone, was awarded The Forward Prize and the T.S. Eliot Prize.

Burnside is also the author of two collections of short stories, Burning Elvis (2000), and Something Like Happy  (2013), as well as several novels, including The Dumb House (1997), The Devil's Footprints, (2007), Glister, (2009) and A Summer of Drowning, (2011). His multi-award winning memoir, A Lie About My Father, was published in 2006 and its successor Waking Up In Toytown, in 2010. A further memoir, I Put A Spell On You combined personal history with reflections on romantic love, magic and popular music. His short stories and feature essays have appeared in numerous magazines and journals, including The New Yorker, The Guardian and The London Review of Books, among others. He also writes an occasional nature column for New Statesman. In 2011 he received the Petrarca-Preis, a major German international literary prize.

Burnside's work is inspired by his engagement with nature, environment and deep ecology.  His collection of short stories, Something Like Happy, was published in 2013.

He is a Fellow of the Royal Society of Literature (elected in 1999) and in March 2016 was elected a Fellow of the Royal Society of Edinburgh, Scotland's National Academy for science and letters.

He also lectures annually and oversees the judging of the writing prize at The Alpine Fellowship.

Awards 
1988 Scottish Arts Council Book Award, for The Hoop
1991 Scottish Arts Council Book Award, for Common Knowledge
1994 Geoffrey Faber Memorial Prize, for Feast Days
1999 Encore Award for The Mercy Boys
2000 Forward Poetry Prize (Best Collection – shortlist), for The Asylum Dance
2000 T. S. Eliot Prize (shortlist), for The Asylum Dance
2000 Whitbread Book Award, Poetry Award, for The Asylum Dance
2002 Saltire Society Scottish Book of the Year Award (shortlist), for The Light Trap
2002 T. S. Eliot Prize (shortlist), for The Light Trap
2005 Forward Poetry Prize (Best Collection - shortlist), for The Good Neighbour
2006 Saltire Society Scottish Book of the Year Award for A Lie About My Father
2008 Cholmondeley Award
2011 Petrarca-Preis
2011 PEN/Ackerley prize (shortlist) for Waking Up in Toytown
2011 Corine Literature Prize for A Lie About My Father
2011 Forward Prize for Black Cat Bone
2011 Costa Book Awards (Novel), shortlist, A Summer of Drowning
2011 T. S. Eliot Prize for Black Cat Bone
2012: Spycher: Literaturpreis Leuk with Judith Schalansky
2017: Hörspiel des Jahres für Coldhaven, translation. composition and directing: Klaus Buhlert (SWR)
2018: Hörspielpreis der Kriegsblinden für Coldhaven. translation. composition and directing: Klaus Buhlert (SWR)

Bibliography

Poetry collections
 The Hoop (Carcanet, 1988)
 Common Knowledge (Secker and Warburg, London, 1991)
 Feast Days (Secker and Warburg, London, 1992)
 The Myth of the Twin (Jonathan Cape, London, 1994)
 Swimming in the Flood (Jonathan Cape, London, 1995)
 Penguin Modern Poets (Penguin, 1996)
 A Normal Skin (Jonathan Cape, London, 1997)
 The Asylum Dance (Jonathan Cape, London, 2000)
 The Light Trap (Jonathan Cape, London, 2002)
 A Poet's Polemic (2003)
 The Good Neighbour (Jonathan Cape, 2005)
 Selected Poems (Jonathan Cape, 2006)
 Gift Songs (Jonathan Cape, 2007)
 The Hunt in the Forest (Jonathan Cape, 2009)
 Black Cat Bone (Jonathan Cape, 2011)
 All One Breath (Jonathan Cape, 2014)
 Still Life with Feeding Snake (Jonathan Cape, 2017)
 In the Name of the Bee/ Im Namen der Biene (Golden Luft, Mainz 2018)
 Learning to Sleep (Jonathan Cape, 2021)
 Apostasy (Dare-Gale Press, 2022)

Fiction
 The Dumb House (Jonathan Cape, London, 1997)
 The Mercy Boys (Jonathan Cape, London, 1999)
 Burning Elvis (Jonathan Cape, London, 2000)
 The Locust Room (Jonathan Cape, London, 2001)
 Living Nowhere (Jonathan Cape, London, 2003)
 The Devil's Footprints (Jonathan Cape, 2007)
 The Glister (Jonathan Cape, 2008)
 A Summer of Drowning (Jonathan Cape, 2011)
 Something Like Happy (Jonathan Cape, 2013)
 Ashland & Vine (Jonathan Cape, 2017)
 Havergey (Little Toller, 2017)

Non-Fiction
 Wild Reckoning (Gulbenkian, 2004), joint editor with Maurice Riordan of this anthology of ecology-related poems
 A Lie About My Father (Biography, 2006)
 Wallace Stevens : poems / selected by John Burnside (Poet to Poet Series, Faber and Faber, 2008)
Waking up in Toytown (Biography, Jonathan Cape, 2010)
 I Put a Spell on You (Biography, Jonathan Cape, 2014)

 The Music of Time: Poetry in the Twentieth Century (Literary Criticism, 2019)
 Aurochs and Auks: Essays on mortality and extinction (Little Toller Books, 2021)

Screen
 Dice (with A. L. Kennedy), a series for television, produced by Cité-Amérique, Canada

Critical studies and reviews of Burnside's work
John Burnside: Contemporary Critical Perspectives (London and New York: Bloomsbury, 2020).
'Dwelling Places : An Appreciation of John Burnside', special edition of Agenda Magazine, Vol 45 No 4/Vol 46 No 1, Spring/Summer 2011
 Review of All one breath.

Footnotes

External links
 Short essay in November 2011 issue of The New Humanist
 Article in the Spring 2007 issue of Tate etc. magazine
 John Burnside at The New Statesman
 Profile at the Poetry Archive
 Profile at the British Council
 Guardian profile and article listing
 Scottish Arts Council September 2004 Poem of the Month : "hommage to Kåre Kivijärvi"
 Biography on the Scottish Poetry Library website, with recordings of him reading his poems, and links to poem texts

What We (non)Believe: Reading Poems by Charles Wright, John Burnside, and Kevin Hart from Cordite Poetry Review

1955 births
Living people
Academics of the University of St Andrews
Fellows of the Royal Society of Literature
British columnists
Alumni of Anglia Ruskin University
People from Cowdenbeath
People from Corby
20th-century Scottish poets
21st-century Scottish poets
21st-century British male writers
Scottish male poets
Poets associated with Dundee
People associated with the University of Dundee
Writers of Gothic fiction
20th-century British male writers
T. S. Eliot Prize winners